This is a comprehensive discography for the solo works of Matthew Good, a Canadian singer-songwriter.

Demos

Albums

Studio albums

Compilations and live albums

 Note: Contains material from the Matthew Good Band as well as Matthew Good's solo releases.

Extended plays

Singles

Music videos

See also
 Matthew Good Band discography

References

Discographies of Canadian artists
Folk music discographies